Charlton Mackrell is a village in civil parish of The Charltons, in the county of Somerset, England, situated  east of Somerton in the South Somerset district. The village has a population of 1,020.

The parish consists of two villages, Charlton Mackrell and Charlton Adam.  Both villages have approximately similar populations. There are also small settlements at Lytes Cary, Cary Fitzpaine (east of the A37 Fosse Way) and West Charlton. West Charlton is the shrunken remains of the original village of Charlton Mackrell.

History

The Fosse Way runs through the parish and Roman villa sites associated with it have been found at Windmill Hill. The parishes of Charlton Adam and Charlton Mackrell were part of the hundred of Somerton.

In the 16th century two medieval fields were divided which delayed inclosure until the 18th century, leading to the current patchwork of fields.

The Charltons have been home to several of the ancestors of politicians in the United States of America. Henry Adams and Edith Squire were married in the parish church in 1609 and she is thought to be the ancestor of Presidents John Adams, John Quincy Adams and Calvin Coolidge, as well as of Samuel Adams, who also signed the Declaration of Independence, while Presidents Millard Fillmore and William Howard Taft were descendants of her two sisters Ann and Margaret.

The manor was bought around 1800 by William Dickinson of Kingweston whose family held it until 1930.

A railway station served the village as part of the Great Western Railway, from 1905 to 1962.

Governance

The parish council has responsibility for local issues, including setting an annual precept (local rate) to cover the council's operating costs and producing annual accounts for public scrutiny. The parish council evaluates local planning applications and works with the local police, district council officers, and neighbourhood watch groups on matters of crime, security, and traffic. The parish council's role also includes initiating projects for the maintenance and repair of parish facilities, as well as consulting with the district council on the maintenance, repair, and improvement of highways, drainage, footpaths, public transport, and street cleaning. Conservation matters (including trees and listed buildings) and environmental issues are also the responsibility of the council. The civil parish was renamed from Charlton Mackrell to The Charltons on 13 March 2014

The village falls within the Non-metropolitan district of South Somerset, which was formed on 1 April 1974 under the Local Government Act 1972, having previously been part of Langport Rural District. The district council is responsible for local planning and building control, local roads, council housing, environmental health, markets and fairs, refuse collection and recycling, cemeteries and crematoria, leisure services, parks, and tourism.

Somerset County Council is responsible for running the local services such as education, social services, libraries, main roads, public transport, policing and fire services, trading standards, waste disposal and strategic planning.

It is also part of the Somerton and Frome county constituency represented in the House of Commons of the Parliament of the United Kingdom. It elects one Member of Parliament (MP) by the first past the post system of election, and was part of the South West England constituency of the European Parliament prior to Britain leaving the European Union in January 2020, which elected seven MEPs using the d'Hondt method of party-list proportional representation.

Geography

Just outside the village to the south west, near the main Langport and Castle Cary Railway line is the  Green Down Nature Reserve run by the Somerset Wildlife Trust. It is on the side of Windmill Hill and provides a habitat for a range of species including the largest number of large blue butterflies anywhere in the world. At the eastern end of the reserve is a Powder House which was used by the Great Western Railway to store dynamite used in the construction of the Somerton Tunnel from 1903 to 1905.

Landmarks

The Abbey, Charlton Adam is a small country house which dates from the 16th century. The house takes its name from the fact that it was the site of the Chantry Chapel of the Holy Spirit, founded in 1237, of which some fragments may be incorporated.  The interiors contain some Elizabethan panelling and reused earlier bits and pieces. It has been designated by English Heritage as a Grade I listed building.

Lytes Cary is larger and has parts which date from the 14th century. A Tudor great hall was added in the mid-15th century, and a great chamber and other rooms in 1533. Other rooms and ranges were added until the Lytes family sold the manor in the mid-18th century. It is now owned by the National Trust and is also Grade I listed.

Charlton House is dated as being built in 1726 by Thomas Lyte on the site of an earlier building. The Court was built in 1792. Both are grade II* listed.

Religious sites

The Church of St Mary in West Charlton dates from the 13th century.

The Church of St Peter and St Paul, on Church Hill, is slightly more recent.

References

External links

 Local history website for the parish of Charlton Mackrell

Villages in South Somerset
Former civil parishes in Somerset